Note — many sporting events did not take place because of World War I

1915 in sports describes the year's events in world sport.

American football
College championship
 College football national championship – Cornell Big Red, Minnesota Golden Gophers, Oklahoma Sooners, Pittsburgh Panthers

Professional championships
 New York League champions – Rochester Jeffersons
 Ohio League champions – Youngstown Patricians

Events
 14 November — Jim Thorpe plays his first professional football game in a 16–0 Canton Bulldogs' loss to the Massillon Tigers. The game is also the first match-up between the two clubs since the 1906 scandal.

Association football
England
 The Football League – Everton 46, Oldham Athletic 45, Blackburn Rovers 43, Burnley 43, Manchester City 43, Sheffield United 43
 FA Cup final – Sheffield United 3–0 Chelsea at Old Trafford, Manchester
 Football League membership at the end of the 1914–15 season is:
Division One (20 clubs) — Aston Villa, Blackburn Rovers, Bolton Wanderers, Bradford City, Bradford Park Avenue, Burnley, Chelsea, Everton, Liverpool, Manchester City, Manchester United, Middlesbrough, Newcastle United, Notts County, Oldham Athletic, Sheffield United, The Wednesday, Sunderland, Tottenham Hotspur, West Bromwich Albion
Division Two (20 clubs) — Arsenal, Barnsley, Birmingham City, Blackpool, Bristol City, Bury, Derby County, Fulham, Glossop, Grimsby Town, Huddersfield Town, Hull City, Leeds City, Leicester City, Leyton Orient, Lincoln City, Nottingham Forest, Preston North End, Stockport County, Wolverhampton Wanderers
 The continuance of World War I after the 1914–15 season causes the suspension of top-class football until 1919, with many footballers signing up to fight for their country. The FA Cup and Football League are not contested again until after the end of the war, although regional leagues and cups are set up at various times.
Germany
 National Championship – suspended during World War I

Athletics
Marathon
 First official running of the Mount Marathon Race, Seward, Alaska

Australian rules football
VFL Premiership
 18 September: Carlton wins the 19th VFL Premiership, beating Collingwood 11.12 (78) to 6.9 (45) at the Melbourne Cricket Ground (MCG) in the 1915 VFL Grand Final.
South Australian Football League:
 26 June: By drawing 4.8 (32) each with Port Adelaide, South Adelaide end the Magpies’ run of 29 consecutive victories, including one against Carlton and one against a combined team from the other six SAFL clubs.
 25 September: Sturt win their first SAFL premiership, beating Port Adelaide 6.10 (46) to 4.10 (34) in the 1915 SAFL Grand Final.
West Australian Football League:
 25 September: Subiaco 3.3 (21) defeat Perth 2.7 (19) for their third WAFL premiership.

Bandy
Sweden
 Championship final – IFK Uppsala 2–0 AIK

Baseball
World Series
 8–13 October — Boston Red Sox (AL) defeats Philadelphia Phillies (NL) to win the 1915 World Series by 4 games to 1

Boxing
Events
 5 April — Jess Willard, the latest "Great White Hope", defeats Jack Johnson with a 26th-round knockout in sweltering heat at Havana, Cuba.  Willard becomes very popular among white Americans for "bringing back the championship to the white race".
 While six world titles remain unchanged in 1915, the World Welterweight Championship changes hands three times in less than three months between June and August.  Finally, it comes to Ted "Kid" Lewis, who defeats Jack Britton twice to win and then retain the title, which will interchange between these two over the next four years.
Lineal world champions
 World Heavyweight Championship – Jack Johnson → Jess Willard
 World Light Heavyweight Championship – Jack Dillon
 World Middleweight Championship – Al McCoy
 World Welterweight Championship – Matt Wells → Mike Glover → Jack Britton → Ted "Kid" Lewis
 World Lightweight Championship – Freddie Welsh
 World Featherweight Championship – Johnny Kilbane
 World Bantamweight Championship – Kid Williams
 World Flyweight Championship – Jimmy Wilde

Canadian football
Grey Cup
 7th Grey Cup – Hamilton Tigers 13–7 Toronto Rowing Association

Cricket
Events
 Because of World War I, there is no first-class cricket in South Africa in the 1914–15 season, nor in England in 1915.  Australia goes ahead with the 1914–15 Sheffield Shield competition but then suspends first-class cricket until 1919.  Similarly, in New Zealand, the Plunket Shield is contested but then there is no first-class cricket until 1918.  Only in India is first-class cricket able to continue through the war years.
England
 County Championship – not contested due to World War I
 Minor Counties Championship – not contested due to World War I
Australia
 Sheffield Shield – Victoria
 Most runs – Jack Ryder 445 @ 74.16 (HS 151)
 Most wickets – Bert Ironmonger 36 @ 17.52 (BB 7–69)
India
 Bombay Quadrangular – Hindus shared with Parsees
New Zealand
 Plunket Shield – Canterbury
South Africa
 Currie Cup – not contested due to World War I
West Indies
 Inter-Colonial Tournament – not contested

Cycling
Tour de France
 not contested due to World War I
Giro d'Italia
 not contested due to World War I

Figure skating
World Figure Skating Championships
 not contested due to World War I

Golf
Major tournaments
 British Open – not contested due to World War I
 US Open – Jerome Travers
Other tournaments
 British Amateur – not contested due to World War I
 US Amateur – Robert A. Gardner

Horse racing
England
 Grand National – Ally Sloper
 1,000 Guineas Stakes – Vaucluse
 2,000 Guineas Stakes – Pommern
 The Derby – Pommern
 The Oaks – Snow Marten
 St. Leger Stakes – Pommern
Australia
 Melbourne Cup – Patrobas
Canada
 King's Plate – Tartarean
Ireland
 Irish Grand National – Punch
 Irish Derby Stakes – Ballaghtobin
USA
 Kentucky Derby – Regret
 Preakness Stakes – Rhine Maiden
 Belmont Stakes – The Finn

Ice hockey
Stanley Cup
 22–26 March — Vancouver Millionaires (PCHA) defeats Ottawa Senators (NHA) in the 1915 Stanley Cup Finals by 3 games to 0
Events
 Winnipeg Monarchs win the Allan Cup

Motorsport

Multi-sport events
Far Eastern Championship Games
 Second Far Eastern Championship Games held in Shanghai, Republic of China

Rowing
The Boat Race
 Oxford and Cambridge Boat Race – not contested due to World War I

Rugby league
Events
 Huddersfield becomes the second team to achieve the celebrated "All Four Cups" feat.  Huddersfield at this time is known as the "Team of all the Talents".
 The continuance of World War I after the 1914–15 season causes the suspension of top-class rugby league until 1919.
England
 Championship – Huddersfield
 Challenge Cup final – Huddersfield 37–3 St. Helens at Watersheddings, Oldham
 Lancashire League Championship – Wigan
 Yorkshire League Championship – Huddersfield
 Lancashire County Cup – Rochdale Hornets 3–2 Wigan
 Yorkshire County Cup – Huddersfield 31–0 Hull
Australia
 NSW Premiership – Balmain (outright winner)

Rugby union
Five Nations Championship
 Five Nations Championship series is not contested due to World War I

Speed skating
Speed Skating World Championships
 not contested due to World War I

Tennis
Australia
 Australian Men's Singles Championship –  Gordon Lowe (GB) defeats Horace Rice (Australia) 4–6 6–1 6–1 6–4
England
 Wimbledon Men's Singles Championship – not contested due to World War I
 Wimbledon Women's Singles Championship – not contested due to World War I
France
 French Men's Singles Championship – not contested due to World War I
 French Women's Singles Championship – not contested due to World War I
USA
 American Men's Singles Championship – Bill Johnston (USA) defeats Maurice McLoughlin (USA) 1–6 6–0 7–5 10–8
 American Women's Singles Championship – Molla Bjurstedt Mallory (Norway) defeats Hazel Hotchkiss Wightman (USA) 4–6 6–2 6–0
Davis Cup
 1915 International Lawn Tennis Challenge – not contested

References

 
Sports by year